Granulina canariensis is a species of very small sea snail, a marine gastropod mollusk or micromollusk in the family Granulinidae.

Description

Distribution
This species occurs in the Atlantic Ocean off the Canary Islands.

References

Granulinidae
Gastropods described in 2001